Chung Cheng High School may refer to the following secondary schools in Singapore:

Chung Cheng High School (Main), in Marine Parade
Chung Cheng High School (Yishun), in Yishun